The Emirate of Riyadh was the first iteration of the Third Saudi State from 1902 to 1913. It was a monarchy led by the House of Saud. The state was formed after Saudi forces seized Riyadh from the control of the Emirate of Ha'il, led by the House of Rashid, during the Battle of Riyadh. It was the direct antecedent of the Emirate of Nejd and Hasa, and the earliest legal predecessor of present-day Saudi Arabia. Al-Hasa was conquered in 1913.

See also
 History of Saudi Arabia
 Unification of Saudi Arabia
 Emirate of Diriyah
 Emirate of Nejd
 Emirate of Nejd and Hasa
 Emirate of Jabal Shammar
 Sultanate of Nejd
 Kingdom of Hejaz
 Kingdom of Hejaz and Nejd

References

External links

Former Arab states
Ottoman Arabia
Nejd
History of Nejd
History of Saudi Arabia
Najd
1920s in Saudi Arabia
1930s in Saudi Arabia
States and territories established in 1902
States and territories disestablished in 1921
1902 establishments in Asia
1921 disestablishments in Asia
Former emirates